The 2007 Irish Greyhound Derby took place during August and September with the final being held at Shelbourne Park in Dublin on 7 September 2007.

The winner Tyrur Rhino won €175,000 and was trained by Paul Hennessy, owned and bred by P.J.Fahy. The race was sponsored by the Paddy Power.

Final result 
At Shelbourne, 7 September (over 550 yards):

Distances 
1¼, ¾, 1¾, ¾, dis (lengths)

Competition Report
There was a high quality entry for the 2007 Irish Derby that included the 2007 English Greyhound Derby 2nd, 3rd and 5th in Loyal Honcho, Forest Scholes and Ullid Connor respectively. Also lining up were Laurels champion Ardkill Jamie and defending champion Razldazl Billy. Only Forest Scholes could win in the first round and Loyal Honcho could not take his place in round two due to lameness.

Razldazl Billy who had recently won the Champion Stakes won well in round two, as did most of the other leading contenders. The third round saw Razldazl Billy lose out to Ardkill Jamie and in a major shock the defending champion failed to progress along with Bar The Devil. Another major casualty at this stage was Forest Scholes.

In the quarter finals Farloe Black impressed in 29.70 with Express Ego, Groovy Stan and Ardkill Jamie providing the other heat winners, Shelbourne Aston would go no further in the event. The Paul Hennessy pair of Tyrur Rhino and Tyrur Laurel had progressed through the rounds comfortably and then both won their respective semi-finals. Tyrur Rhino took the first heat from Groovy Stan and So Determined in 30.11 and then Tyrur Laurel defeated Ardkill Jamie and Express Ego in 29.89.

Despite being defeated in the semi-finals Ardkill Jamie was sent off a short 5-4 favourite in the final and broke well from the traps. Express Ego and Tyrur Rhino challenged to the first bend which resulted in Ardkill Jamie being crowded. This left Tyrur Rhino in front and he led all the way fighting of the challenge of Express Ego and the strong finishing Tyrur Laurel. Tyrur Laurel finished second to give owner P.J Fahy the first two home but Groovy Stan broke a hock.

Quarter finals

Semi finals

See also 
2007 UK & Ireland Greyhound Racing Year

References

Greyhound Derby
Irish Greyhound Derby
Irish Greyhound Derby